Todd Smith is the eleventh studio album by American rapper LL Cool J. It was released on April 11, 2006 by Def Jam Recordings. It includes collaborations with Jennifer Lopez, Pharrell, Juelz Santana, Teairra Mari, Jamie Foxx, Ginuwine, Mary J. Blige, 112, Mary Mary, Ryan Toby (from City High) and Freeway. Producers on the project include Pharrell, Scott Storch, Bink!, Shea Taylor, Keezo Kane and Trackmasters.

Music and lyrics
Todd Smith is composed of radio-friendly hip hop, with LL Cool J foregoing street material in favor of straightforward, commercial pop-rap. Much of the album is built on minimalist, distilled synthesized rap, featuring thick drum swirls and bright record production. The lyrics demonstrate LL Cool J comfortably rapping slow songs exclusively aimed at the opposite sex.

Promotion
Jermaine Dupri-produced dance track "Control Myself" served as the album's lead single. Another song with singer Jennifer Lopez after their collaboration on "All I Have" on Lopez's 2002 album This Is Me... Then, it was originally to feature Fergie from The Black Eyed Peas; however difference in terms of payment resulted in her being replaced by Lopez. LL Cool J and Lopez shot a music video  for "Control Myself," directed by Hype Williams, on January 2, 2006 at Sony Studios, New York. "Freeze" featuring Lyfe Jennings was released as the album's second single.

Music and lyrics
Todd Smith is composed of radio-friendly hip hop, with LL Cool J foregoing street material in favor of straightforward, commercial pop-rap. Much of the album is built on minimalist, distilled synthesized rap, featuring thick drum swirls and bright record production. The lyrics demonstrate LL Cool J comfortably rapping slow songs exclusively aimed at the opposite sex.

Critical reception

Todd Smith was met with "mixed or average" reviews from critics. At Metacritic, which assigns a weighted average rating out of 100 to reviews from mainstream publications, this release received an average score of 51 based on 17 reviews. AllMusic found that "the album proves that Cool James always has and always will have wit and style to spare" and while he "makes few pretenses to being street, Todd Smith is straight commercial pop-rap," resuling into "solid radio-friendly hip-hop from a veteran of the genre." Michael Frauenhofer from PopMatters described the album as "adequate [...] glossy, safe, front-loaded, and slick. My mom likes it, enough said. And the young-girl LL Cool J fans will love it too, regardless of what we say here. As for the rest of us? We can go home, we can play "Mama Said Knock You Out" and "Rock the Bells" on our stereos, and we can wait for his next inevitable metamorphosis."

Entertainment Weeklys Tom Sinclair critisized the album fpr its "big-name-guest-star-choked affairs" and wrote: "Too bad LL Cool J feels he needs the extra wattage, because Todd Smiths best moments come when he raps alone, letting his inimitably confident flow shine. Some of these jams will no doubt click with the club crowd, but we wish our man would jettison the human baggage, team up with his old producer Rick Rubin, and knock us out again." Similarly, Rolling Stone critic Peter Relic remarked: "Eight of thirteen tracks on Todd Smith qualify as slow-jam duets, and none of them has a sweat droplet of the appeal of 1987's LL-as-Lothario classic "I Need Love" [...] leaving one wondering whatever happened to the immortal MC who could carry an album by himself without needing a breath."

Chart performance
Todd Smith debuted and peaked at six on the US Billboard 200, selling 116,000 units in first week of release. This marked LL Cool J's 11th and his eighth top ten title on the Billboard 200. The set also opened at number two on both the Top R&B/Hip-Hop Albums and the Top Rap Albums charts. Todd Smith was certified gold by the Recording Industry Association of America (RIAA) on May 18, 2006 . By May 2008, it had sold 335,000 copies in the United States, according to Nielsen SoundScan.

Track listing

Notes
 signifies a co-producer
 signifies an additional producer

Sample credits
"It's LL and Santana" contains a sample from "Blind Man" as performed by New Birth.
"Control Myself" contains a sample from "Looking for the Perfect Beat" by Afrika Bambaataa & Soul Sonic Force.
"Preserve the Sexy":
Contains a sample of the recording "From the Love Side" as performed by Hank Ballard & The Midnight Lighters.
Contains a sample of "Get Up, Get Into It, Get Involved (Parts I & II)",  "Make It Funky (Part I)" and "My Thang" as performed by James Brown.
"What You Want":
Contains a sample of "Hot Wheels (The Case)" as performed by Badder Than Evil.
Contains an interpolation of "Heaven and Hell on Earth" as written by M. Oliver.
Contains a sample of "Nobody Beats The Biz" as performed by Biz Markie.
"Down the Aisle" contains a sample of "If You Were Here Tonight" as performed by Alexander O'Neal.
"We're Gonna Make It" contains samples form the recording "You've Got a Friend" as performed by Donny Hathaway.
"So Sick (Remix)" contains replayed elements from "Human Nature" as written by Donny Hathaway.

Charts

Weekly charts

Year-end charts

Certifications

References

External links
MTV Interview regarding the album

2006 albums
LL Cool J albums
Def Jam Recordings albums
Albums produced by Bink (record producer)
Albums produced by Scott Storch
Albums produced by the Neptunes
Albums produced by Trackmasters
Albums produced by Jermaine Dupri
Albums produced by LL Cool J